Russellville High School may refer to:

 Russellville High School (Alabama), Russellville, Alabama
 Russellville High School (Arkansas), Russellville, Arkansas
 Russellville High School (Kentucky), Russellville, Kentucky 
 Russellville High School (Missouri), Russellville, Missouri
 Russell High School (East Point, Georgia), formerly named Russellville High School